Robert Duncanson may refer to:

Robert Duncanson (Army officer) (1658–1705), Scottish professional soldier
Robert S. Duncanson (1821–1872), American painter

See also
Robert Duncan (disambiguation)
Duncanson (surname)